The Birmingham and Bristol Railway was a short-lived railway company, formed in 1845 by the merger of the Birmingham and Gloucester Railway and the Bristol and Gloucester Railway.

Origin
At Gloucester the latter had formed a junction with the  broad gauge Cheltenham and Great Western Union Railway running into the town on mixed gauge tracks. In 1843 the C&GWU had been taken over by the Great Western Railway which began putting pressure on the Bristol and Gloucester to join the GWR at Bristol, to subscribe to the proposed South Devon Railway, and to convert to broad gauge track, to the alarm of the Northern "narrow" gauge railways.

The "break-of-gauge" at Gloucester was a major problem. It caused pandemonium as whole trainloads of passengers, and their luggage, changed from one to another, together with the transshipment of goods.

Formation
Parliament had established a commission to examine the problem and there was a consensus that the track should be unified throughout the line. The GWR made an offer to the Birmingham and Bristol directors. The latter's shareholders held out for more, and the GWR deferred its decision for three days. At this moment the Midland Railway made its move.

True or not, the story of how it came about is a part of railway legend, when the Midland's John Ellis was travelling, quite by chance it is said, in a train with two Bristol & Gloucester directors. He overheard them discussing the matter, and took it on himself to offer better terms.

In 1846, the Bristol and Birmingham and Midland Railways Act allowed the lines to merge and become part of the  Midland Railway. The bill was managed by Samuel Carter, who was solicitor to both Midland and LNWR.

The LNWR was also alarmed at the idea of the GWR's broad gauge reaching the Midlands and it offered to share any losses the Midland might incur. In the event, all that was needed was a nominal rent for the Midland's use of the LNWR's Birmingham New Street station.

There were, of course, still problems with gauge. In 1848 the Midland built its own line into Gloucester, avoiding the GWR ex-Cheltenham & Great Western Union line, and laid mixed gauge to Bristol. By 1857 the whole line had been converted to standard gauge.

References 

 

Railway companies established in 1845
Railway companies disestablished in 1846
Early British railway companies
Midland Railway
British companies disestablished in 1846
British companies established in 1845